WSSW (89.1 FM) is a radio station licensed to Platteville, Wisconsin, United States. The station is part of Wisconsin Public Radio (WPR) and broadcasts WPR's "NPR News and Classical Network", consisting of classical music and news and talk programming.

See also
 Wisconsin Public Radio

External links
Wisconsin Public Radio

SSW
Wisconsin Public Radio
Classical music radio stations in the United States
NPR member stations